The Assistant to the Secretary of Defense for Intelligence Oversight, formerly the Senior Intelligence Oversight Official, or SIOO, was responsible to the U.S. Secretary of Defense for the independent oversight of all intelligence, counterintelligence, and intelligence-related activities in the Department of Defense. The organization's charter is articulated in DoD Directive 5148.13. The ATSD(IO) ensures that all activities performed by intelligence, counterintelligence, and intelligence related units are conducted in accordance with Federal law, Executive Orders, DoD directives, regulations and policies.   In July 2014, this position was retitled as the Department of Defense Senior Intelligence Oversight Official (DoD SIOO), after the position was aligned within the Office of the Deputy Chief Management Officer (DCMO).  On January 11, 2021, the Acting Secretary of Defense directed the "re-establishment" of the ATSD(IO) office and title. On September 1, 2021, the Department of Defense disestablished the ATSD (IO) and subordinated the DoD Intelligence Oversight function under a new Assistant to the Secretary of Defense for Privacy, Civil Liberties & Transparency, ASTD (PCLT).

Background 
The perceived need for a Department of Defense (DoD) Intelligence Oversight (IO) program came about as a result of certain activities conducted by DoD intelligence and counter-intelligence units against U.S. persons involved in the Civil Rights and anti-Vietnam War movements. During the 1960s and 1970s, the United States experienced significant civil demonstrations from protesters associated with these movements. Some of these demonstrations were believed to be beyond the ability of civilian authorities to control, and military forces were used to assist in the restoration of order. Units deploying for this purpose discovered they needed basic pre-deployment intelligence to perform their missions. The Army, designated as executive agent for providing aid to civilian authorities, requested assistance from the Federal Bureau of Investigation (FBI). When the FBI was unable to provide the information needed, the Army began collecting it. Over time, this collection mushroomed and led to abuse of the Constitutional rights of our citizens. Eventually, DoD intelligence personnel were using inappropriate clandestine and intrusive means to collect information on the legitimate political positions and expressions of U.S. persons, accumulating that information in a nationwide data bank, and sharing that information with law enforcement authorities. For example, during the 1960s and 1970s, military counterintelligence special agents established, maintained, and disseminated files on civil rights activists and organizers. These were not legitimate DoD targets.  Counterintelligence special agents penetrated organizations such as the "Resistors in the Army" and the "Friends of Resistors in the Army" and recruited members of these organizations as informers.  These organizations posed no foreign threat.  So called "dissidents", actually U.S. persons who were exercising their First Amendment rights, were placed under surveillance and their movements were observed and recorded. These U.S. persons were not legitimate DoD counterintelligence targets.  Radio communications of civil rights and anti-war demonstrators were intercepted by military intelligence personnel. The interception of these communications was improper.  Using media cover, military counterintelligence special agents infiltrated the 1968 Democratic National Convention in Chicago. There was no legitimate Defense investigative purpose for this action.  Information collected by Defense elements was routinely transferred to civilian law enforcement authorities without evidence of criminal activity or relevance to the law enforcement missions of the receiving authorities. This activity was improper.

In the early and mid 1970s several Congressional committees, including the Church, Pike, and Ervin committees, conducted investigations and public hearings. After three and a half years of investigation, these committees determined that what had occurred was a classic example of what we would today call "mission creep." What had begun as a simple requirement to provide basic intelligence to commanders charged with assisting in the maintenance and restoration of order, had become a monumentally intrusive effort. This resulted in the monitoring of activities of innocent persons involved in the constitutionally protected expression of their views on civil rights or anti-war activities. The information collected on the persons targeted by Defense intelligence personnel was entered into a national data bank and made available to civilian law enforcement authorities. This produced a chilling effect on political expression by those who were legally working for political change in domestic and foreign policies. Senator Ervin concluded "the collection and computerization of information by government must be tempered with an appreciation of the basic rights of the individual, of his right to privacy, to express himself freely and associate with whom he chooses." As a result of these investigations, DoD imposed severe restrictions on future surveillance of U.S. persons, required that information already in DoD files be destroyed, and established a structure to regulate future DoD intelligence collection.

In 1976, President Ford issued an Executive Order placing significant controls on the conduct of all intelligence activities. Executive Order (EO) 11905, as the charter for the Intelligence Community, included provisions for an intelligence oversight mechanism. Consequently, the Secretary of Defense directed establishment of an Inspector General for Intelligence in the Office of the Secretary of Defense, responsible for the independent oversight of all DoD intelligence activities. EO 12036, signed by President Carter in 1978, and the current Executive Order, EO 12333, signed by President Reagan in 1981, continued the requirement for oversight to maintain the proper balance between the acquisition of essential information by the Intelligence Community, and the protection of individuals' constitutional and statutory rights.

In November 1982, following the establishment of the DoD Inspector General, the Deputy Secretary of Defense directed that the Inspector General for Intelligence be redesignated as the Assistant to the Secretary of Defense (Intelligence Oversight) (ATSD (IO)). In August 2014, as part of an ongoing reorganization to meet Secretary of Defense Guidance, the DoD realigned IO functions within OSD related to compliance with Executive Order 12333 under the Office of the Deputy Chief Management Officer (now called the Chief Management Officer) within the Office of the Secretary of Defense.  This action organized the former ATSD(IO) under the ODCMO (now the OCMO), retitling and affirming that position as the Department of Defense Senior Intelligence Oversight Official.  Today, the DoD SIOO has direct access to the Secretary of Defense, reporting on Intelligence Oversight activities at least quarterly, along with reporting directly to the Intelligence Oversight Board (IOB), a standing committee of the President's Foreign Intelligence Advisory Board (PIAB).

Responsibilities
The DoD SIOO is responsible to the Secretary of Defense for the independent oversight of all intelligence, counterintelligence, and intelligence-related activities in the Department of Defense. The organization's charter can be found in DoD Directive 5148.13. The DoD SIOO ensures that all activities performed by intelligence, counterintelligence, and intelligence related units are conducted in accordance with Federal law, Executive Orders, DoD directives, regulations and policies.

The DoD SIOO is also charged with the management and direction of the DoD Intelligence Oversight program. The aim of the DoD program is to institutionalize:

 The orientation and training of all intelligence personnel in intelligence oversight concepts,
 An internal inspection program, and
 A channel for the reporting of questionable or improper intelligence activities to the DoD SIOO and the DoD General Counsel, who are responsible for informing the Secretary and Deputy Secretary of Defense.

Included in the DoD IO program are the intelligence, counterintelligence, and intelligence related units, staffs, and activities of the Joint Staff, Combatant Commands, Office of the Secretary of Defense, Military Services, Defense Intelligence Agency, National Security Agency, National Reconnaissance Office, and the National Geospatial-Intelligence Agency.

Officeholders

References

External links 
Department of Defense Senior Intelligence Oversight Official